Winding Gulf is a  long tributary of the Guyandotte River in Raleigh County, West Virginia.

Winding Gulf's entire course and drainage area are in southern Raleigh County. It then turns west to follow the Norfolk and Western Railroad and flows through the communities of Big Stick and McAlpin. At McAlpin, it turns to the south to run along County Route 30 and West Virginia Route 16; this portion of the creek flows through the communities of Stotesbury, Tams, Ury, and Helen. Stonecoal Creek flows into Winding Gulf from the east in Stonecoal Junction, and shortly past their confluence, Winding Gulf flows into the Guyandotte River from the north in Amigo.

According to 1992 U.S. Geological Survey data, 92.54% of the Winding Gulf watershed was forested; 3.99% was used for agriculture, 1.67% for mining, and 1.82% for other uses.

See also
List of rivers of West Virginia

References

Rivers of West Virginia
Rivers of Raleigh County, West Virginia
Tributaries of the Guyandotte River